The Kyiv Laboratory for Artificial Intelligence (NeuroTechnica) is a research institute in Kyiv, the capital of Ukraine.

Research 

 Speech recognition,
 Speech synthesis,
 Prototype of the system to understand text in a natural language,
 Recognition of the hand-written information,
 Optical character recognition,
 System of the automatic construction of
  Spellcheckers for arbitrary linear languages,
  Translation systems with elements of the semantic analysis,
  Translation memory,
  Vocabularies,
 Systems of training to languages,
 Web robots,
 and others.

Current project "Veliar-3" 
 the system to understand text in a natural language,
 program-instrumental system of automatisation of programming
("PICAP"):
 language support Cprolog,
 construct logics support Veliar-2,
 filemanager Fmgr,
 text editor Fedit,
 language support Perl-6,
 language support Lisp-13,
 language support Common-Lisp,
 language support CLIPS,
 primary key hierarchy database support BTIO,
 database support BerkeleyDB,
 connection support with С-compilers.

Previous projects 
 "Veliar-2" - further development of the basis project,
 "Veliar" - programming language, for developing systems of "Artificial Intelligence" class,
 "Gebe Deutschunterricht" (Teaching German) - multimedia system,
 Cossack "3D speaking head" (Cossack - multimedia program with mimics for speech synthesis)

External links
Official site (in Russian)

Artificial intelligence laboratories
Research institutes in Ukraine
Organizations based in Kyiv
Laboratories in Ukraine